Jeffrey Maxwell DeGrandis (born December 1, 1957) is an American animator, director, and producer. Currently he's Executive Producer at Warner Bros Animation on "Dorothy and the Wizard of Oz." Jeff has served as Supervising Producer on Dora the Explorer, Go, Diego, Go!, and Ni Hao, Kai-Lan. He recently produced, directed, voice directed and created The Finster Finster Show! short for Random! Cartoons and voiced Chicken #1. He's had 5 Emmy Nominations, Peabody Award, and won 2 Imagine Awards.

Born and raised in Colts Neck, New Jersey, DeGrandis studied animation at the California Institute of the Arts. Prior to entering CalArts, he graduated from Christian Brothers Academy and Monmouth University. DeGrandis got his first big break working on Chuck Jones' segment on the 1992 movie Stay Tuned, and his first television animation work was on The Ren and Stimpy Show.

His other credits include God, the Devil and Bob (supervising producer & director), Toonsylvania (producer), The Shnookums and Meat Funny Cartoon Show (co-producer with Bill Kopp and director), Mad Jack the Pirate (director), Capertown Cops (director), Dexter's Laboratory (storyboard artist), Timon and Pumbaa (director), Mighty Ducks (timing director), Animaniacs (director), and The Patrick Star Show (director; credited as storyboard supervisor).

DeGrandis also wrote, produced, storyboard designed and directed the 2001 animated direct to video film Timber Wolf.

In addition to his animation work, DeGrandis is also noted for his drawings of drag racing cars, which emulate the style of one of DeGrandis' early influences, Ed "Big Daddy" Roth. He has also been an active drag racer as well.

The Finster Finster Show!: Store Wars

The Finster Finster Show! was created by DeGrandis when he was a student at CalArts in 1982. He developed a short film based on the concept and even recorded the voices himself in 1983. While working as an executive producer to several Nickelodeon / Nick Jr. productions, he pitched the idea to Nickelodeon and Frederator Studios for the "fourth season of Oh Yeah! Cartoons". They gave him the greenlight, he did the storyboards and scripts and the voice recording was done exactly 23 years after the 1983 voice recording of the short film. The short aired in Random! Cartoons in 2008.

References

External links

1957 births
Living people
People from Colts Neck Township, New Jersey
Animators from New Jersey
California Institute of the Arts alumni
Christian Brothers Academy (New Jersey) alumni
Monmouth University alumni
American male voice actors
American voice directors
American animated film directors
American animated film producers
American television directors
Film producers from New Jersey
American storyboard artists
American male screenwriters
Film directors from New Jersey
Screenwriters from New Jersey
Television producers from New Jersey